Duophonic sound was a trade name for a type of audio signal processing used by Capitol Records on certain releases and re-releases of mono recordings issued during the 1960s and 1970s. In this process monaural recordings were reprocessed into a type of artificial stereo. Generically, the sound is commonly known as fake stereo or mock stereo.

This was done by splitting the mono signal into two channels, then delaying one channel's signal by means of delay lines and other circuits, i.e. desynchronizing the two channels by fractions of a second, and cutting the bass frequencies in one channel with a high-pass filter, then cutting the treble frequencies in the other channel with a low-pass filter. The result was an artificial stereo effect, without giving the listener the true directional sound characteristics of real stereo. In some cases, the effect was enhanced with reverberation and other technical tricks, sometimes adding stereo echo to mono tracks in an attempt to fool the listener.

Capitol employed this technique in order to increase its inventory of stereo LPs, thus satisfying retailer demand for more stereo content (and helping promote the sale of stereo receivers and turntables). For nearly ten years Capitol used the banner "DUOPHONIC – For Stereo Phonographs Only" to differentiate the Duophonic LPs from its true stereo LPs.

Capitol began using the process in June 1961 and continued its practice into the 1970s. It was used for some of the biggest Capitol releases, including albums by The Beach Boys and Frank Sinatra. Over the years, however, some Duophonic tapes were confused with true stereo recordings in Capitol Records' vaults, and were reissued on CD throughout the 1980s and 1990s. Capitol intentionally reissued some of the Beatles' Duophonic mixes on The Capitol Albums, Volume 1 and The Capitol Albums, Volume 2, in 2004 and 2006, respectively.

On rare occasions some artists deliberately used fake stereo to achieve an intended artistic effect. In such situations artificial stereo was used when certain elements of a mono mix could not be reproduced for a stereo remix. An example is the Beatles' stereo mix of the song "I Am the Walrus", where the first portion of the piece is true stereo, but switches to artificial stereo at approximately the two-minute mark for the remainder of the song; this is because the live radio feeds from a BBC broadcast of King Lear were mixed directly into the mono mix of the song, and could not (with the pre-digital technology of that time) be extricated and discreetly superimposed onto the stereo mix. Later remixes of the song, such as that included in the Love soundtrack album, are in true stereo for the complete song. Similarly, the mono mix of the song "Only a Northern Song" featured sound effects that were made during the mixing process and could only with difficulty be remade for a stereo remix, so the song was released in fake stereo on the 1969 album Yellow Submarine. However, the 1999 album Yellow Submarine Songtrack features a full stereo remix of the song, and the 2009 remaster of the original 1969 album restores the song to its original mono mix because enhanced stereo had fallen out of favor.

Other record companies used similar processing of monophonic material to create a stereo effect, but referred to it by other terms, such as RCA Records' "electronically reprocessed stereo" and Columbia Records' "Electronically Re-channeled for Stereo". As with Capitol, Columbia's artificial stereo issues included albums by major artists, such as Miles Davis ('Round About Midnight, CL 949 mono, reissued in stereo as PC 8649).

See also
 Precedence effect

References

External links
The "Arcane Radio Trivia" blog on Duophonic recordings

1960s establishments in the United States
1970s disestablishments in the United States
Audio engineering
Capitol Records
Musical texture